The 2011 UEFA Super Cup was the 36th UEFA Super Cup, between the reigning champions of the two club competitions organised by the European football governing body UEFA: the UEFA Champions League and the UEFA Europa League. It took place at the Stade Louis II in Monaco on 26 August 2011. It was contested by the 2010–11 UEFA Champions League winners Barcelona of Spain and the 2010–11 UEFA Europa League winners Porto of Portugal. Barcelona won the title defeating Porto 2–0.

Venue
The Stade Louis II in Monaco has been the venue for the UEFA Super Cup every year since 1998. Built in 1985, the stadium is also the home of AS Monaco, who play in the French league system.

Teams

Match

Details

Statistics

See also
FC Barcelona in international football competitions
FC Porto in international football competitions

References

External links
2011 UEFA Super Cup, UEFA.com

2011
Super Cup
2011 in Monégasque sport
Super Cup 2011
Super Cup 2011
Super
International club association football competitions hosted by Monaco
August 2011 sports events in Europe